The following is a timeline of the history of Warsaw in Poland.

Prior to 19th century
 1390 - St. John's Cathedral construction begins.
 1413 - Duke Janusz I of Warsaw from the Piast dynasty confirmed and extended the city rights of the Warsaw Old Town.
 1529 - Sejm of the Kingdom of Poland held in Warsaw.
 1534 - Paper mill established.
 1556–1557 - Sejm of the Kingdom of Poland held in Warsaw.
 1563–1564 - Sejm of the Kingdom of Poland held in Warsaw.
 1566 - Polish diet relocated to Warsaw from Kraków.
 1573
 28 January: Warsaw Confederation signed.
 Sigismund Augustus Bridge built.
 1575 - Royal elections in Poland begin in nearby Wola.
 1578 - George Frederick, Margrave of Brandenburg-Ansbach paid homage to King of Poland Stephen Báthory.
 1580 - Old City Hall, Warsaw rebuilt.
 1596 - Polish royal court relocated to Warsaw from Kraków by Sigismund III Vasa.

 1603 - Sigismund Augustus Bridge collapses.
 1611
 29 October: Shuysky Tribute.
 16 November: John Sigismund, Elector of Brandenburg paid homage to King of Poland Sigismund III Vasa.
 1619 - Royal Castle rebuilt.
 1621 - George William, Elector of Brandenburg paid homage to King of Poland Sigismund III Vasa.
 1641 - Frederick William, Elector of Brandenburg paid homage to King of Poland Władysław IV Vasa.
 1643 - Warsaw Arsenal built.
 1644 - Sigismund's Column erected in Castle Square.
 1655 - City besieged by Swedish forces.
 1656 - July: Battle of Warsaw (1656).
 1689 - Warsaw becomes capital of Poland.
 1702 - City taken by Swedes.
 1727 - Saxon Garden opens.

 1747 - Załuski Library founded.
 1764 - City taken by Russians.
 1785 - Jabłonowski Palace built.
 1786 - Królikarnia completed.
 1788 - Lazienki gardens laid out.
 1791 - Praga becomes part of city.
 1792 - Tyszkiewicz Palace completed.
 1794
 17 April: Warsaw Uprising (1794) begins.
 4 November: Battle of Praga; city taken by Russians.
 1795 - City annexed by Prussia in the Third Partition of Poland.

19th century
 1804 - Warsaw Lyceum (school) established.
 1806 - City occupied by French forces.
 1807 - City becomes capital of Duchy of Warsaw.
 1809 - April–June: Austrians in power.
 1810 - Music School established.
 1813 - 8 February: Russians in power.
 1815 - City becomes capital of Kingdom of Poland being in a personal union with the Russian Empire.
 1816 - University of Warsaw established.
 1817 - Warsaw Mercantile Exchange established.
 1819 - Museum and Institute of Zoology established.
 1830
 Nicolaus Copernicus Monument unveiled.
 November Uprising (1830–31); Polish–Russian War 1830–31.
 1831 - September: Battle of Warsaw (1831).

 1833 - Grand Theatre opens.
 1845 - Warsaw–Vienna railway begins operating.
 1857 - Hotel Europejski in business.
 1860
 Krasiński Library opens.
 Zachęta (art society) founded.
 Population: 161,008.
 1862
  (school) and Museum of Fine Arts established.
 Ha-Tsefirah newspaper begins publication.
 1863 - January Uprising.
 1865 - Alexander Bridge built.
 1866 - Horsecar tram begins operating.
 1869 - Cathedral of St. Mary Magdalene built in Praga.
 1872 - Population: 276,000.
 1875 - Sokrates Starynkiewicz becomes mayor.
 1878 - Great Synagogue built on Tłomackie Street.
 1880 - Evangelical Reformed Parish church built.
 1882 - Population: 406,261.
 1887 - Population: 436,750.
 1897 - Population: 624,189.
 1898
 University of Technology opens.
 24 December: Adam Mickiewicz Monument unveiled.

20th century

1900s–1939

 1901
 Warsaw Philharmonic founded.
 Hotel Bristol in business.
 Population: 756,426.
 1905 - Unrest. See also Alfonse Pogrom. 
 1906 - Yidishes tageblat newspaper begins publication.
 1907 - Electric streetlights installed.
 1908
 Electric streetcar begins operating.
 Iluzjon cinema opens.
 1911 - Polonia Warsaw football club (future multi-sports club) founded.
 1913
 Hotel Polonia Palace in business.
 Aleksander Kakowski becomes Catholic archbishop.
 Polish Theatre in Warsaw opens.
 1914 - Poniatowski Bridge built.
 1916
 Wola becomes part of city.
 National Museum active.
 1917 - Office for the Regulation and Building of the City established.
 1919 - 4–5 January: 1919 Polish coup attempt.

 1920 - August: Battle of Warsaw (1920).
 1921
 KS Warszawianka football club (future multi-sports club) founded.
 Population: 936,713.
 1922 - 17 March: Warsaw Accord signed.
 1924 -  begins publication.
 1925 - Tomb of the Unknown Soldier, Warsaw established at Piłsudski Square.
 1926
 12–14 May: May Coup (Poland).
 14 November: Frederic Chopin Monument unveiled.
 1927
 AZS Warsaw wins its first Polish ice hockey championship.
 International Chopin Piano Competition begins.
 1928 -  opens.
 1929
 12 October: Warsaw Convention signed.
 AZS Warsaw wins its first Polish women's volleyball championship.
 1930
  (art entity) founded.
 AZS Warsaw wins its first Polish men's volleyball championship.
 AZS Warsaw wins its first Polish women's basketball championship.
 1931 - Warsaw Railway Museum established.
 1933
 Legia Warsaw wins its first Polish ice hockey championship.
 Warsaw Cross-City Line (railway) begins operating.
 1934
 Polonia Warsaw wins its first Polish women's basketball championship.
 Warsaw hosts the 1934 World Fencing Championships.
 1935
 August: Warsaw hosts the 6th Chess Olympiad.
 2 November: Hungarian Cultural Institute opened.
 1936 - Museum of Warsaw established.
 1937 - Polonia Warsaw wins its first Polish men's volleyball championship.
 1938
  (cinema) opens.
 Coat of arms of Warsaw redesign adopted.

World War II (1939–1945)

 1939
 1 September: Bombing of Warsaw in World War II by German forces begins.
 8–28 September: Siege of Warsaw (1939) by German forces.
 27 September: German occupation begins.
 1 October: The Einsatzgruppe IV Nazi paramilitary death squad entered the city.
 26 October: Polish Secret Teaching Organization founded.
 26–27 December: Wawer massacre perpetrated by the Germans.
 October 1939–February 1940: Mass arrests and executions of Poles carried out by the Germans in various parts of Warsaw and in the Kabaty Woods and Palmiry during the genocidal Intelligenzaktion campaign.
 1940
 Spring–summer: Second wave of mass arrests, roundups, deportations to concentration camps and executions of Poles carried out by the Germans during the AB-Aktion.
 16 October: Jewish Warsaw Ghetto established by Germans.
 1941 - Another wave of mass arrests, deportations to concentration camps and executions of Poles carried out by the Germans.
 1942
 July: German Grossaktion Warsaw (1942) begins.
 Pabst Plan created.
 1943 - April–May: Warsaw Ghetto Uprising.

 1944
 27 July: German Festung Warschau established.
 August–October: Warsaw Uprising against German occupation.
 1 August: Execution at Powązkowska Street perpetrated by the Germans.
 2 August: Massacres in the Jesuit monastery on Rakowiecka Street and in the Mokotów prison perpetrated by the Germans.
 3 August: Massacre at 111 Marszałkowska Street perpetrated by the Germans.
 3–4 August: Massacre at Bracka Street perpetrated by the Germans.
 4–25 August: Ochota massacre perpetrated by the Germans.
 5–12 August: Wola massacre perpetrated by the Germans.
 August–September: Suppression of Mokotów by the Germans.
 21 August: Mass murder on Dzika street perpetrated by the Germans.
 Mass expulsion of Poles from Warsaw.
 Germans conduct planned destruction of Warsaw.
 Życie Warszawy newspaper begins publication.
 1945
 January: Soviet forces take city; German occupation ends.
 14 February:  (city reconstruction bureau) established.

1945–1990s
 1946
 Polonia Warsaw wins its first Polish football championship.
 Społem Warsaw wins its first Polish men's volleyball championship.
 1947 - AZS Warsaw wins its first Polish men's basketball championship.
 1948
 Stefan Wyszyński becomes Catholic archbishop.
 PKM Warsaw wins its first Team Speedway Polish Championship.
 Spójnia Warsaw wins its first Polish women's basketball championship.

 1949 - Six-Year Plan for the Reconstruction of Warsaw created.
 1950 - Adam Mickiewicz Museum of Literature established.
 1951 - Białołęka, Okęcie, Wilanów, and Włochy become part of city.
 1952 - 22 July: Constitution Square inaugurated.
 1953 - Old Town Market Place restored.
 1954 - Fryderyk Chopin Museum established.
 1955
 10th-Anniversary Stadium opens.
 Crooked Circle Club active.
 Palace of Culture and Science built.
 International Warsaw Pact military alliance headquartered in city.
 Legia Warsaw wins its first Polish football championship.
 1956
 Legia Warsaw wins its first Polish men's basketball championship.
 Poles demonstrate solidarity with the Hungarian Revolution of 1956, massively bring aid to the Hungarian Cultural Institute, organize fundraising for Hungarians (see also Hungary–Poland relations).
 1957 - AZS Warsaw wins its first Polish rugby championship.
 1959
 Polonia Warsaw wins its first Polish men's basketball championship.
 Kampinos National Park created near city.
 1961
 Warsaw Chamber Opera founded.
 Legia Warsaw wins its first Polish women's volleyball championship.
 1962 - Legia Warsaw wins its first Polish men's volleyball championship.
 1963 - St. John's Cathedral rebuilt.
 1964
 20 July: Monument to the Heroes of Warsaw unveiled.
 Skra Warsaw wins its first Polish rugby championship.

 1965 - Population: 1,252,558.
 1966 - Foksal Gallery of art opens.
 1967
 Maria Skłodowska-Curie Museum opened.
  becomes mayor.
 1973 - Nusantara Archipelago Museum established.
 1974
 Łazienkowski Bridge opens.
  built on Marszałkowska Street.
 Ujazdów Castle rebuilt.
 1975
 Warszawa Centralna railway station opens.
 Intraco I hi-rise built
 1978
 Museum of Caricature established.
 Intraco II hi-rise built.
 1979
 15 February: 1979 Warsaw gas explosion.
 June: Catholic pope John Paul II visits city.
 1980 - Population: 1,596,073.
 1981 - Józef Glemp becomes Catholic archbishop.
 1983
 Warsaw hosts the International Congress of Mathematicians.
 1 October: Mały Powstaniec monument unveiled.
 1985 - Antonina Leśniewska Museum of Pharmacy established.
 1987 - Warsaw hosts the 1987 IAAF World Cross Country Championships.
 1989
 4 April: Polish Round Table Agreement signed in Warsaw.
 Gazeta Wyborcza newspaper begins publication.
 Marriott hi-rise built.
 1 August: Warsaw Uprising Monument unveiled.
 Monument of Jews and Poles Common Martyrdom unveiled.
 1991 - Warsaw Stock Exchange reestablished.
 1992 - Public Transport Authority established.
 1993 - Katyń Museum established.
 1994
 City divided into 11 districts: Bemowo, Białołęka, Bielany, Centrum, Rembertów, Targówek, Ursus, Ursynów, Wawer, Wilanów, and Włochy.
 Warsaw Business Journal begins publication.
 Polish-Japanese Academy of Information Technology founded (see also Japan–Poland relations).
 1995
 Warsaw Metro begins operating.
 May: Warsaw hosts the 1995 European Weightlifting Championships.
 14 August: Józef Piłsudski Monument unveiled.
 17 September: Monument to the Fallen and Murdered in the East unveiled.
 1996 - Sister city relationship established with San Diego, USA.
 1997
 Centrum Handlowe Targówek (shopping centre) opens.
 March: Warsaw hosts the 1997 World Single Distance Speed Skating Championships.
 May: Warsaw co-hosts the 1997 European Wrestling Championships.
 1998
 Centrum metro station opens.
 Warsaw Financial Center built.
 1999
 City becomes capital of the Masovian Voivodeship.
 10 June: Monument to the Polish Underground State and Home Army unveiled.
 Warsaw Trade Tower built.
 2000 - Świętokrzyski Bridge and Cinema City Sadyba open.

21st century

 2001
 Kinoteka (cinema) opens.
 Atrium Center built.
 2002
 Wesoła becomes part of city.
 Siekierkowski Bridge opens.
  established.
 November: Warsaw hosts the 2002 World Weightlifting Championships.
 2003
 March: Warsaw hosts the 2003 World Short Track Speed Skating Championships.
 InterContinental Warsaw hi-rise built.
 2005
 29 April: Museum of Modern Art established.
 1 June: Copernicus Science Centre established.
 2006
 Janusz Korczak Monument unveiled.
 Hanna Gronkiewicz-Waltz becomes mayor.
 Rondo 1 hi-rise built.
 2007
 January: Warsaw hosts the 2007 European Figure Skating Championships.
 11 May: Monument to Georgian officers of the Polish Army who lost their lives in the Katyn massacre, in the Warsaw Uprising and on many fronts of World War II unveiled (see also Georgia–Poland relations).
 14 June:  (cinema) in business.
 December: Warsaw hosts the 2007 European Judo Open Championships.
 2009 – Warsaw co-hosts the EuroBasket 2009.
 2010 – 16 November: Tadeusz Kościuszko Monument unveiled.

 2012
 National Stadium opens.
 Warsaw co-hosts the UEFA Euro 2012.
 2013
 September: Labor demonstration.
 Twarda Tower built.
 Population: 1,724,404.
 2014
 14 May: Honorary Consulate of Iceland opened.
 31 October: Digvijaysinhji Ranjitsinhji monument unveiled (see also India–Poland relations).
 2015
 Warsaw Metro Line 2 begins operating.
 27 May: 2015 UEFA Europa League Final held in Warsaw.
 3 October: Danuta Siedzikówna monument unveiled.
 December: Political demonstration.

 2016 - 8–9 July: 2016 Warsaw summit.
 2017
 April: Warsaw hosts the 2017 European Judo Championships.
 13 May: Witold Pilecki monument unveiled.
 August: Warsaw co-hosts the 2017 Men's European Volleyball Championship.
 19 September: Monument to Hungarian soldiers who aided the Polish Warsaw Uprising of 1944 unveiled (see also Hungary–Poland relations).
 2020 - June: Warsaw hosts the 2020 European Table Tennis Championships.
 2021 - April: Warsaw hosts the 2021 European Wrestling Championships.

Historical affiliations

See also

 History of Warsaw
 List of mayors of Warsaw
 List of bishops and archbishops of Warsaw

References

This article incorporates information from the Polish Wikipedia and Dutch Wikipedia.

Bibliography

Published in 18th and 19th centuries
 
 
 
 
 

Published in 20th century
 
 
 
 
 
 
 
 
 
 
 
 

Published in 21st century
 Barbara Czarniawska. (2002) Remembering while forgetting: The role of automorphism in city management in Warsaw. Public Administration Review, 62(2): 163-173.

External links

 Europeana. Items related to Warsaw, various dates.
 Digital Public Library of America. Items related to Warsaw, various dates.

 
Warsaw
warsaw
Years in Poland
Warsaw-related lists
Warsaw